9XS9 can refer to:
 The FAA code for Rancho Verde Airport
 The former FAA code for Sack-O-Grande Acroport (the code is now 9X9)